The Right (La Droite) is a political party in France founded in 1998 by Charles Millon. This came following his expulsion from the Union for French Democracy due to alliances he formed with the National Front, which allowed him to get elected as president of the Rhône-Alpes regional council. The most conservative French right-wingers such as Michel Junot, Claude Reichman, Jean-François Touzé, Alain Griotteray and Michel Poniatowski were present at the creation of the movement.

After the failure of Millon's project to merge La Droite into Charles Pasqua's Rassemblement pour la France (RPF) and the Centre national des indépendants et paysans (CNI), Millon founded the Liberal Christian Right (Droite libérale chrétienne) in October 1999. However, most members of La Droite refused to join the new party. Only three deputies, including Charles Millon, joined it. The first two of these deputies were beaten at the 2002 legislative election while the last one didn't run himself. In September 2002, Charles Millon was then named ambassador to the Food and Agriculture Organization (FAO) of the United Nations, while the Millonist group at the Rhône-Alpes regional council (Oui à Rhône-Alpes, ORA) fusionned itself with the Union for a Popular Movement (UMP) conservative party, led by Nicolas Sarkozy. The DLC was therefore put in stand-by although it officially continues to exist.

External links

Right-wing parties in France
Political parties established in 1998
1998 establishments in France